Jacqueline Kudler (born 1935) is a poet and educator who lives in Sausalito, California.

Writing

In 1999, Kudler helped to found Sixteen Rivers Press, a poetry-publishing collective of which she remains a member. Her first collection of poetry, The Sacred Precinct, was published in 2004. Easing Into Dark, her second volume, came out in 2012.

For many years she wrote hiking columns with her sister, Arlene Stark, that appeared in the Pacific Sun. A collection of their hikes, Walking from Inn to Inn, was published in 1986.

The Marin Poetry Center awarded her its first Calliope Award for Lifetime Achievement in June, 2010.

Teaching

She helped to found North Bay School in 1971, and taught language arts there until 1982.

She has taught writing and literature at College of Marin since 1985.

References

External links 
 Sacred Precinct page on sixteenriverspress.org

1935 births
Living people
American women poets
21st-century American women